Jason Ankrah (born February 26, 1991) is a gridiron football linebacker who is currently a free agent. He played college football at University of Nebraska and attended Quince Orchard High School in Gaithersburg, Maryland. He has been a member of the Houston Texans, Tennessee Titans and Ottawa Redblacks.

Early years
Ankrah played high school football for the Quince Orchard High School Cougars. He recorded 55 tackles and seven sacks his senior year. The Cougars finished with ten wins and two losses, advancing to the Maryland 4A West Regional Final. He was also named first-team all-state as a senior. He recorded 50 tackles and 5 sacks his junior year. The Cougars finished undefeated with 14 wins and won the class 4A state championship.

College career
Ankrah played football for the Nebraska Cornhuskers from 2010 to 2013. He was redshirted in 2009.

Professional career

Houston Texans
Ankrah was signed by the Houston Texans on May 16, 2014, after going undrafted in the 2014 NFL Draft. He made his NFL debut on September 14, 2014 against the Oakland Raiders, recording one tackle. He was released by the Texans on August 31, 2015.

Tennessee Titans
Ankrah was signed to the Tennessee Titans' practice squad on September 9, 2015.

Ottawa Redblacks
On January 26, 2017, Ankrah signed with the Ottawa Redblacks as a defensive lineman. He played in two games for the Redblacks during the 2017 season. He was released by the team on July 3, 2017.

Coaching
In 2019, Ankrah became head coach of Central High School in Schuyler, Nebraska.
In the 2023 season, Ankrah will be looking forward to becoming the head coach of Great Mills High School in Lexington Park, Maryland

References

External links
College stats

Living people
1991 births
American football linebackers
Canadian football defensive linemen
African-American players of American football
African-American players of Canadian football
Nebraska Cornhuskers football players
Houston Texans players
Tennessee Titans players
Ottawa Redblacks players
Players of American football from Maryland
People from Montgomery Village, Maryland
21st-century African-American sportspeople